U ime naroda (trans. In the Name of the People) is the first live album by Serbian and former Yugoslav influential rock band Riblja Čorba. The album was recorded on the band's concert held on April 11, 1982 in Pionir Hall in Belgrade.

The album title alludes to the censorship the band's leader Bora Đorđević fought at the time of album release.

The album was polled in 1998 as the 85th on the list of 100 greatest Yugoslav rock and pop albums in the book YU 100: najbolji albumi jugoslovenske rok i pop muzike (YU 100: The Best albums of Yugoslav pop and rock music).

Album cover
The album cover was designed by Jugoslav Vlahović.

Track listing
"Vidiš da sam gadan kad sam tebe gladan" (R. Kojić, B. Đorđević) – 3:14
"Prevara" (M. Aleksić, M. Milatović, B. Đorđević) – 3:35
"Egoista" (B. Đorđević) – 2:09
"Ostaću slobodan" (M. Aleksić, B. Đorđević) – 3:09
"Dva dinara, druže" (M. Bajagić, B. Đorđević) – 5:46
"Nemoj, srećo, nemoj danas" (M. Bajagić, B. Đorđević) – 4:10
"Evo ti za taksi" (M. Bajagić, B. Đorđević) – 3:27
"Ostani đubre do kraja" (M. Aleksić, B. Đorđević) – 5:03
"Vetar duva, duva, duva" (B. Đorđević) – 1:44
"Lutka sa naslovne strane" (B. Đorđević) – 4:32
"Neću da ispadnem životinja" (B. Đorđević) – 3:52
"Volim, volim, volim žene" (B. Đorđević) – 3:30

Personnel
Bora Đorđević - vocals
Rajko Kojić - guitar
Momčilo Bajagić - guitar
Miša Aleksić - bass guitar
Miroslav Milatović - drums

Additional personnel
Dragan Vukićević - producer, recorded by
Draža Sužnjević - recorded by

Reception

U ime naroda was sold in more than 160,000 copies, becoming the best-selling live album in the history of Yugoslav rock music.

Legacy
In 1987, in YU legende uživo (YU Legends Live), a special publication by Rock magazine, U ime naroda was pronounced one of 12 best Yugoslav live albums. In 1998, the album was polled as the 85th on the list of 100 greatest Yugoslav rock and pop albums in the book YU 100: najbolji albumi jugoslovenske rok i pop muzike (YU 100: The Best albums of Yugoslav pop and rock music).

References 

U ime naroda at Discogs
 EX YU ROCK enciklopedija 1960-2006,  Janjatović Petar;  
 Riblja čorba,  Jakovljević Mirko;

External links 

Riblja Čorba live albums
1982 live albums
PGP-RTB live albums